Icon Ventures is an American venture capital firm located in Palo Alto, California, United States.

History

Icon Ventures was founded by Joe Horowitz in 2003 in Palo Alto, California under the name Jafco Ventures. The company rebranded as Icon Ventures in January 2015. Until 2014, its capital was exclusively provided by JAFCO, a Japanese investment fund. 

In October 2017, Icon Ventures raised its sixth fund of $265M from a diversified group of investors. 

In October 2018, the firm announced an expansion of that fund to $375M.

Business description

Icon Ventures has historically funded early stage, and growth stage investments in private technology-based businesses. Significant technology companies that it has backed include Bill.com, Teladoc, FireEye, Palo Alto Networks, and Proofpoint. 

Icon Ventures Fund I is currently listed as the 6th best performing fund of recent times in the sub-$250M category by Pitchbook. 

As of August 2021, its most recent lead investments were At Bay, Nomad Health, Timescale  and Quizlet.

See also
 Venture Capital

References

External links
 Icon Ventures Homepage

Financial services companies established in 2003
Privately held companies based in California
Companies based in Palo Alto, California
Venture capital firms of the United States